Nexian is an Indonesian mobile phone company which was acquired by Spice Group in 2011. Started in 2006 by Martono Jayakusuma. They were the first local brand who achieved 100,000 locally produced handset in 6 month. It has the fourth largest market share with 5% of mobile phones in Indonesia. Nexian creates mostly QWERTY mobile phones. They sell smartphones with multi SIM cards in-one on budget markets.

Products

Android

Nexian Android A890 Journey is Nexian's first Android smartphone. It has a single SIM card slot. The Nexian Journey NX-A890 debuted at the Indonesia Cellular Show (ICS) in 2011.

Nexian Android A891 Ultra Journey Single GSM. The Nexian Journey NX-A891 debuted at the Indonesia Cellular Show (ICS) in 2011.

Nexian Android A892 Cosmic Journey dual GSM. The Nexian Journey NX-A892 debuted at the Indonesia Cellular Show (ICS) in 2011.

Nexian Tablet Android A7500 Genius. The Nexian Journey NX-A7500 debuted at the Indonesia Cellular Show (ICS) in 2011.

GSM
All GSM phones have two SIM card slots. Some phones have applications such as eBuddy and Facebook. The three main mobile phone operators in Indonesia (Telkomsel, XL Axiata and Indosat) are in partnership with Nexian to launch its GSM phones. Currently, there are also smartphones with new features such as a TV antenna on its NX-T911. Most GSM smartphones are manufactured with QWERTY keyboards.

In Yahoo! Search Trends 2011, Indonesian people search Nexian G-965 Champion as number 8 of 10 most gadget search. It is a smartphone touch series with 3.5" HVGA Capacitive Touch Screen and is provided with EDGE and WiFi. The launching price is less than Rp800,000 ($80.8).

CDMA
All of Nexian's CDMA phones and smartphones have a similar system with the GSM phones. Some phones use the term NX-FPxxx for phones in partnership with Telkom's Flexi CDMA service. Phones such as NX-C900 are one of Nexian's CDMA smartphones that uses QWERTY keyboard.

Hybrid 
Nexian has produced Candybar Handsets and QWERTY Dual SIM handsets. In October 2010, the mobile phone company launched the Nexian Hybrid NX-271D that can support three cards (2GSM + 1CDMA) as well as standby (Triple On). It is not the first handphone in Indonesia with capability of Triple On.

Awards
 Product Of The year 2011 - Nexian She (NX-G788)
 Digital Marketing Award 2011 Category Handphone - Great Performing Brand in Social Media
 Golden Ring Award 2011 - Most Favorite Local Brand and Best Innovative Local Brand
 Solo Best Brand Index 2011 - Best Local Brand 
 Word of Mouth Marketing(WOMM)Award 2011 - Best Local Brand
 Markplus Award 2010 - Best in Market Driving And Best Innovation
 Marketing Award 2010 - Customers Satisfaction Award
 ICA 2010 - The Best Value Services for Nexian Messenger
 Seluler Award 2010 - The Best Local Brand and The Best Favourite Music Concept
 Golden Ring Award 2010 - The Best Qwerty Local Brand 2010 (NX-G801)
 Golden Ring Award 2010 - The Best Entry Level Phone 2010 (NX-G330 Dangdut POD)
 Golden Ring Award 2010 - The Best Local Brand 2010
 Golden Ring Award 2009 - The Most Favorite Local Brand

References 

Mobile phone manufacturers
Mobile phone companies of Indonesia
Companies established in 2006
Indonesian brands